Karl-Heinz Spikofski (24 February 1927 – 18 June 1998) was a German football player and coach. A winger, played for Rot-Weiss Essen, 1. FC Köln, Bayer Leverkusen, CO Roubaix-Tourcoing, Calcio Catania, VVV-Venlo and Wormatia Worms. After his playing career, he became a coach, first with FC Sion and then with BC Augsburg.

References

 
German players in Italy, RSSSF

1927 births
1998 deaths
German footballers
Association football midfielders
Ligue 1 players
Serie A players
Eredivisie players
Rot-Weiss Essen players
1. FC Köln players
Bayer 04 Leverkusen players
Torino F.C. players
CO Roubaix-Tourcoing players
Catania S.S.D. players
VVV-Venlo players
Wormatia Worms players
German football managers
FC Sion managers
BC Augsburg managers
German expatriate footballers
German expatriate sportspeople in France
Expatriate footballers in France
German expatriate sportspeople in Italy
Expatriate footballers in Italy
German expatriate sportspeople in the Netherlands
Expatriate footballers in the Netherlands
Footballers from Essen